Cannon Lake or Lake Cannon may refer to:

Lakes in the United States
 Cannon Lake (Rice County, Minnesota), surface area of 1,593 acres
 Cannon Lake (Goodhue County, Minnesota), a smaller lake 50 miles eastwards
 Cannon Lake, in the list of lakes in Cascade County, Montana
 Lake Cannon, a small circular lake in Florida

Other uses
 Cannon Lake (microarchitecture), an Intel processor microarchitecture

See also
 Cannon Creek Lake, a reservoir in Kentucky, US
 Canyon Lake (disambiguation)